Acculturation is a process of social, psychological, and cultural change that stems from the balancing of two cultures while adapting to the prevailing culture of the society. Acculturation is a process in which an individual adopts, acquires and adjusts to a new cultural environment as a result of being placed into a new culture, or when another culture is brought to someone. Individuals of a differing culture try to incorporate themselves into the new more prevalent culture by participating in aspects of the more prevalent culture, such as their traditions, but still hold onto their original cultural values and traditions. The effects of acculturation can be seen at multiple levels in both the devotee of the prevailing culture and those who are assimilating into the culture.

At this group level, acculturation often results in changes to culture, religious practices, health care, and other social institutions. There are also significant ramifications on the food, clothing, and language of those becoming introduced to the overarching culture.

At the individual level, the process of acculturation refers to the socialization process by which foreign-born individuals blend the values, customs, norms, cultural attitudes, and behaviors of the overarching host culture. This process has been linked to changes in daily behaviour, as well as numerous changes in psychological and physical well-being. As enculturation is used to describe the process of first-culture learning, acculturation can be thought of as second-culture learning.

Under normal circumstances that are seen commonly in today's society, the process of acculturation normally occurs over a large span of time throughout a few generations. Physical force can be seen in some instances of acculturation, which can cause it to occur more rapidly, but it is not a main component of the process. More commonly, the process occurs through social pressure or constant exposure to the more prevalent host culture.

Scholars in different disciplines have developed more than 100 different theories of acculturation, but the concept of acculturation has only been studied scientifically since 1918. As it has been approached at different times from the fields of psychology, anthropology, and sociology, numerous theories and definitions have emerged to describe elements of the acculturative process. Despite definitions and evidence that acculturation entails a two-way process of change, research and theory have primarily focused on the adjustments and adaptations made by minorities such as immigrants, refugees, and indigenous people in response to their contact with the dominant majority. Contemporary research has primarily focused on different strategies of acculturation, how variations in acculturation affect individuals, and interventions to make this process easier.

Historical approaches
The history of Western civilization, and in particular the histories of Europe and the United States, are largely defined by patterns of acculturation.

One of the most notable forms of acculturation is imperialism, the most common progenitor of direct cultural change. Although these cultural changes may seem simple, the combined results are both robust and complex, impacting both groups and individuals from the original culture and the host culture. Anthropologists, historians, and sociologists have studied acculturation with dominance almost exclusively, primarily in the context of colonialism, as a result of the expansion of western European peoples throughout the world during the past five centuries.

The first psychological theory of acculturation was proposed in W.I. Thomas and Florian Znaniecki's 1918 study, The Polish Peasant in Europe and America. From studying Polish immigrants in Chicago, they illustrated three forms of acculturation corresponding to three personality types: Bohemian (adopting the host culture and abandoning their culture of origin), Philistine (failing to adopt the host culture but preserving their culture of origin), and creative-type (able to adapt to the host culture while preserving their culture of origin). In 1936, Redfield, Linton, and Herskovits provided the first widely used definition of acculturation as:

Long before efforts toward racial and cultural integration in the United States arose, the common process was assimilation. In 1964, Milton Gordon's book Assimilation in American Life outlined seven stages of the assimilative process, setting the stage for literature on this topic. Later, Young Yun Kim authored a reiteration of Gordon's work, but argued cross-cultural adaptation as a multi-staged process. Kim's theory focused on the unitary nature of psychological and social processes and the reciprocal functional personal environment interdependence.  Although this view was the earliest to fuse micro-psychological and macro-social factors into an integrated theory, it is clearly focused on assimilation rather than racial or ethnic integration. In Kim's approach, assimilation is unilinear and the sojourner must conform to the majority group culture in order to be "communicatively competent."  According to Gudykunst and Kim (2003)  the "cross-cultural adaptation process involves a continuous interplay of deculturation and acculturation that brings about change in strangers in the direction of assimilation, the highest degree of adaptation theoretically conceivable."  This view has been heavily criticized, since the biological science definition of adaptation refers to the random mutation of new forms of life, not the convergence of a monoculture (Kramer, 2003).

In contradistinction from Gudykunst and Kim's version of adaptive evolution, Eric M. Kramer developed his theory of Cultural Fusion (2011, 2010, 2000a, 1997a, 2000a, 2011, 2012) maintaining clear, conceptual distinctions between assimilation, adaptation, and integration. According to Kramer, assimilation involves conformity to a pre-existing form. Kramer's (2000a, 2000b, 2000c, 2003, 2009, 2011) theory of Cultural Fusion, which is based on systems theory and hermeneutics, argues that it is impossible for a person to unlearn themselves and that by definition, "growth" is not a zero-sum process that requires the disillusion of one form for another to come into being but rather a process of learning new languages and cultural repertoires (ways of thinking, cooking, playing, working, worshiping, and so forth).  In other words, Kramer argues that one need not unlearn a language to learn a new one, nor does one have to unlearn who one is to learn new ways of dancing, cooking, talking, and so forth.  Unlike Gudykunst and Kim (2003), Kramer argues that this blending of language and culture results in cognitive complexity, or the ability to switch between cultural repertoires. To put Kramer's ideas simply, learning is growth rather than unlearning.

Conceptual models

Theory of Dimensional Accrual and Dissociation 

Although numerous models of acculturation exist, the most complete models take into consideration the changes occurring at the group and individual levels of both interacting groups. To understand acculturation at the group level, one must first look at the nature of both cultures before coming into contact with one another. A useful approach is Eric Kramer's theory of Dimensional Accrual and Dissociation (DAD). Two fundamental premises in Kramer's DAD theory are the concepts of hermeneutics and semiotics, which infer that identity, meaning, communication, and learning all depend on differences or variance. According to this view, total assimilation would result in a monoculture void of personal identity, meaning, and communication. Kramer's DAD theory also utilizes concepts from several scholars, most notably Jean Gebser and Lewis Mumford, to synthesize explanations of widely observed cultural expressions and differences.

Kramer's theory identifies three communication styles (idolic, symbolic, or signalic ) in order to explain cultural differences. It is important to note that in this theory, no single mode of communication is inherently superior, and no final solution to intercultural conflict is suggested. Instead, Kramer puts forth three integrated theories: the theory Dimensional Accrual and Dissociation, the Cultural Fusion Theory and the Cultural Churning Theory.

For instance, according to Kramer's DAD theory, a statue of a god in an idolic community is god, and stealing it is a highly punishable offense. For example, many people in India believe that statues of the god Ganesh – to take such a statue/god from its temple is more than theft, it is blasphemy. Idolic reality involves strong emotional identification, where a holy relic does not simply symbolize the sacred, it is sacred. By contrast, a Christian crucifix follows a symbolic nature, where it represents a symbol of God. Lastly, the signalic modality is far less emotional and increasingly dissociated.

Kramer refers to changes in each culture due to acculturation as co-evolution. Kramer also addresses what he calls the qualities of out vectors which address the nature in which the former and new cultures make contact. Kramer uses the phrase "interaction potential" to refer to differences in individual or group acculturative processes. For example, the process of acculturation is markedly different if one is entering the host as an immigrant or as a refugee. Moreover, this idea encapsulates the importance of how receptive a host culture is to the newcomer, how easy is it for the newcomer to interact with and get to know the host, and how this interaction affects both the newcomer and the host.

Fourfold models
The fourfold model is a bilinear model that categorizes acculturation strategies along two dimensions. The first dimension concerns the retention or rejection of an individual's minority or native culture (i.e. "Is it considered to be of value to maintain one's identity and characteristics?"), whereas the second dimension concerns the adoption or rejection of the dominant group or host culture. ("Is it considered to be of value to maintain relationships with the larger society?") From this, four acculturation strategies emerge.

Assimilation occurs when individuals adopt the cultural norms of a dominant or host culture, over their original culture. Sometimes it is forced by governments.
Separation occurs when individuals reject the dominant or host culture in favor of preserving their culture of origin. Separation is often facilitated by immigration to ethnic enclaves.
Integration occurs when individuals can adopt the cultural norms of the dominant or host culture while maintaining their culture of origin. Integration leads to, and is often synonymous with biculturalism.
Marginalization occurs when individuals reject both their culture of origin and the dominant host culture.

Studies suggest that individuals' respective acculturation strategy can differ between their private and public life spheres. For instance, an individual may reject the values and norms of the dominant culture in their private life (separation), whereas they might adapt to the dominant culture in public parts of their life (i.e., integration or assimilation).

Predictors of acculturation strategies
The fourfold models used to describe individual attitudes of immigrants parallel models used to describe group expectations of the larger society and how groups should acculturate. In a melting pot society, in which a harmonious and homogenous culture is promoted, assimilation is the endorsed acculturation strategy. In segregationist societies, in which humans are separated into racial, ethnic and/or religious groups in daily life, a separation acculturation strategy is endorsed. In a multiculturalist society, in which multiple cultures are accepted and appreciated, individuals are encouraged to adopt an integrationist approach to acculturation. In societies where cultural exclusion is promoted, individuals often adopt marginalization strategies of acculturation.

Attitudes towards acculturation, and thus the range of acculturation strategies available, have not been consistent over time. For example, for most of American history, policies and attitudes have been based around established ethnic hierarchies with an expectation of one-way assimilation for predominantly White European immigrants. Although the notion of cultural pluralism has existed since the early 20th century, the recognition and promotion of multiculturalism did not become prominent in America until the 1980s. Separatism can still be seen today in autonomous religious communities such as the Amish and the Hutterites. Immediate environment also impacts the availability, advantage, and selection of different acculturation strategies. As individuals immigrate to unequal segments of society, immigrants to areas lower on economic and ethnic hierarchies may encounter limited social mobility and membership to a disadvantaged community. It can be explained by the theory of Segmented Assimilation, which is used to describe the situation when immigrants individuals or groups assimilate to the culture of different segments of the society of the host country. The outcome of whether entering the upper class, middle class, or lower class is largely determined by the socioeconomic status of the last generation.

On a broad scale study, involving immigrants in 13 immigration-receiving countries, the experience of discrimination was positively related to the maintenance of the immigrants' ethnic culture. In other words, immigrants that maintain their cultural practices and values are more likely to be discriminated against than those whom abandon their culture.

Most individuals show variation in both their ideal and chosen acculturation strategies across different domains of their lives. For example, among immigrants, it is often easier and more desired to acculturate to their host society's attitudes towards politics and government, than it is to acculturate to new attitudes about religion, principles, values, and customs.

Mindsponge mechanism
The mindsponge mechanism describes acculturation from the standpoint of information absorption and ejection processes of cultural values. It suggests that each person has a mindset (or a set of core values) that influences their thinking and behaviors, and the person's acculturation happens when their core cultural values alter. When a person is exposed to new cultural values and believes that those values are subjectively beneficial, they are more likely to accept those values to enter the mindset and possibly replace the core cultural values. However, when the emerging and existing values conflict with each other, it does necessarily lead to the rejection of the weaker (or less subjectively valuable) values, but they can co-exist and subsequently influence the person's thinking and behaviors. This phenomenon can be called cultural additivity.

The mechanism has been evidenced by natural and social laws, and elaborated in the mindsponge theory.

Acculturative stress
The large flux of migrants around the world has sparked scholarly interest in acculturation, and how it can specifically affect health by altering levels of stress, access to health resources, and attitudes towards health. The effects of acculturation on physical health is thought to be a major factor in the immigrant paradox, which argues that first generation immigrants tend to have better health outcomes than non-immigrants. Although this term has been popularized, most of the academic literature supports the opposite conclusion, or that immigrants have poorer health outcomes than their host culture counterparts.

One prominent explanation for the negative health behaviors and outcomes (e.g. substance use, low birth weight) associated with the acculturation process is the acculturative stress theory. Acculturative stress refers to the stress response of immigrants in response to their experiences of acculturation. Stressors can include but are not limited to the pressures of learning a new language, maintaining one's native language, balancing differing cultural values, and brokering between native and host differences in acceptable social behaviors. Acculturative stress can manifest in many ways, including but not limited to anxiety, depression, substance abuse, and other forms of mental and physical maladaptation. Stress caused by acculturation has been heavily documented in phenomenological research on the acculturation of a large variety of immigrants. This research has shown that acculturation is a "fatiguing experience requiring a constant stream of bodily energy," and is both an "individual and familial endeavor" involving "enduring loneliness caused by seemingly insurmountable language barriers".

One important distinction when it comes to risk for acculturative stress is degree of willingness, or migration status, which can differ greatly if one enters a country as a voluntary immigrant, refugee, asylum seeker, or sojourner. According to several studies, voluntary migrants experience roughly 50% less acculturative stress than refugees, making this an important distinction. According to Schwartz (2010), there are four main categories of migrants: 
 Voluntary immigrants: those that leave their country of origin to find employment, economic opportunity, advanced education, marriage, or to reunite with family members that have already immigrated.
 Refugees: those who have been involuntarily displaced by persecution, war, or natural disasters. 
 Asylum seekers: those who willingly leave their native country to flee persecution or violence.
 Sojourners: those who relocate to a new country on a time-limited basis and for a specific purpose. It is important to note that this group fully intends to return to their native country.
This type of entry distinction is important, but acculturative stress can also vary significantly within and between ethnic groups. Much of the scholarly work on this topic has focused on Asian and Latino/a immigrants, however, more research is needed on the effects of acculturative stress on other ethnic immigrant groups. Among U.S. Latinos, higher levels of adoption of the American host culture has been associated with negative effects on health behaviors and outcomes, such as increased risk for depression and discrimination, and increased risk for low self-esteem. However, some individuals also report "finding relief and protection in relationships" and "feeling worse and then feeling better about oneself with increased competencies" during the acculturative process. Again, these differences can be attributed to the age of the immigrant, the manner in which an immigrant exited their home country, and how the immigrant is received by both the original and host cultures. Recent research has compared the acculturative processes of documented Mexican-American immigrants and undocumented Mexican-American immigrants and found significant differences in their experiences and levels of acculturative stress. Both groups of Mexican-American immigrants faced similar risks for depression and discrimination from the host (Americans), but the undocumented group of Mexican-American immigrants also faced discrimination, hostility, and exclusion by their own ethnic group (Mexicans) because of their unauthorized legal status. These studies highlight the complexities of acculturative stress, the degree of variability in health outcomes, and the need for specificity over generalizations when discussing potential or actual health outcomes.

Researchers recently uncovered another layer of complications in this field, where survey data has either combined several ethnic groups together or has labeled an ethnic group incorrectly. When these generalizations occur, nuances and subtleties about a person or group's experience of acculturation or acculturative stress can be diluted or lost. For example, much of the scholarly literature on this topic uses U.S. Census data. The Census incorrectly labels Arab-Americans as Caucasian or "White". By doing so, this data set omits many factors about the Muslim Arab-American migrant experience, including but not limited to acculturation and acculturative stress. This is of particular importance after the events of September 11, 2001, since Muslim Arab-Americans have faced increased prejudice and discrimination, leaving this religious ethnic community with an increased risk of acculturative stress. Research focusing on the adolescent Muslim Arab American experience of acculturation has also found that youth who experience acculturative stress during the identity formation process are at a higher risk for low self-esteem, anxiety, and depression.

Some researchers argue that education, social support, hopefulness about employment opportunities, financial resources, family cohesion, maintenance of traditional cultural values, and high socioeconomic status (SES) serve as protections or mediators against acculturative stress. Previous work shows that limited education, low SES, and underemployment all increase acculturative stress. Since this field of research is rapidly growing, more research is needed to better understand how certain subgroups are differentially impacted, how stereotypes and biases have influenced former research questions about acculturative stress, and the ways in which acculturative stress can be effectively mediated.

Other outcomes

Culture
When individuals of a certain culture are exposed to another culture (host) that is primarily more present in the area that they live, some aspects of the host culture will likely be taken and blended within aspects of the original culture of the individuals. In situations of continuous contact, cultures have exchanged and blended foods, music, dances, clothing, tools, and technologies. This kind of cultural exchange can be related to selective acculturation that refers to the process of maintaining cultural content by researching those individuals' language use, religious belief, and family norms. Cultural exchange can either occur naturally through extended contact, or more quickly though cultural appropriation or cultural imperialism.

Cultural appropriation is the adoption of some specific elements of one culture by members a different cultural group. It can include the introduction of forms of dress or personal adornment, music and art, religion, language, or behavior. These elements are typically imported into the existing culture, and may have wildly different meanings or lack the subtleties of their original cultural context. Because of this, cultural appropriation for monetary gain is typically viewed negatively, and has sometimes been called "cultural theft".

Cultural imperialism is the practice of promoting the culture or language of one nation in another, usually occurring in situations in which assimilation is the dominant strategy of acculturation. Cultural imperialism can take the form of an active, formal policy or a general attitude regarding cultural superiority.

Language

In some instances, acculturation results in the adoption of another country's language, which is then modified over time to become a new, distinct, language. For example, Hanzi, the written language of Chinese language, has been adapted and modified by other nearby cultures, including: Japan (as kanji), Korea (as hanja), and Vietnam (as hán tự). Jews, often living as ethnic minorities, developed distinct languages derived from the common languages of the countries in which they lived (for example, Yiddish from High German and Ladino from Old Spanish). Another common effect of acculturation on language is the formation of pidgin languages. Pidgin is a mixed language that has developed to help communication between members of different cultures in contact, usually occurring in situations of trade or colonialism. For example, Pidgin English is a simplified form of English mixed with some of the language of another culture. Some pidgin languages can develop into creole languages, which are spoken as a first language.

Food
Food habits and food consumption are affected by acculturation on different levels. Research has indicated that food habits are discreet and practiced privately, and change occurs slowly. Consumption of new food items is affected by the availability of native ingredients, convenience, and cost; therefore, an immediate change is likely to occur. Aspects of food acculturation include the preparation, presentation, and consumption of food. Different cultures have different ways in which they prepare, serve, and eat their food. When exposed to another culture for an extended period of time, individuals tend to take aspects of the "host" culture's food customs and implement them with their own. In cases such as these, acculturation is heavily influenced by general food knowledge, or knowing the unique kinds of food different cultures traditionally have, the media, and social interaction. It allows for different cultures to be exposed to one another, causing some aspects to intertwine and also become more acceptable to the individuals of each of the respective cultures.

Controversies and debate

Definitions
Anthropologists have made a semantic distinction between group and individual levels of acculturation. In such instances, the term transculturation is used to define individual foreign-origin acculturation, and occurs on a smaller scale with less visible impact. Scholars making this distinction use the term "acculturation" only to address large-scale cultural transactions. Acculturation, then, is the process by which migrants gain new information and insight about the norms and values of their culture and adapt their behaviors to the host culture.

Recommended models
Research has largely indicated that the integrationist model of acculturation leads to the most favorable psychological outcomes and marginalization to the least favorable. While an initial meta-analysis of the acculturation literature found these results to be unclear, a more thorough meta-analysis of 40 studies showed that integration was indeed found to have a "significant, weak, and positive relationship with psychological and sociocultural adjustment". A study was done by Berry (2006) that included 7,997 immigrant adolescents from 13 countries found that immigrant boys tend to have slightly better psychological adaptation than immigrant girls. Overall, immigrants in the integration profile were found to be more well-adapted than those in other profiles. Perceived discrimination was also negatively linked to both psychological and sociocultural adaptation. Various factors can explain the differences in these findings, including how different the two interacting cultures are, and degree of integration difficulty (bicultural identity integration). These types of factors partially explain why general statements about approaches to acculturation are not sufficient in predicting successful adaptation. As research in this area has expanded, one study has identified marginalization as being a maladaptive acculturation strategy.

Typological approach
Several theorists have stated that the fourfold models of acculturation are too simplistic to have predictive validity. Some common criticisms of such models include the fact that individuals don't often fall neatly into any of the four categories, and that there is very little evidence for the applied existence of the marginalization acculturation strategy. In addition, the bi-directionality of acculturation means that whenever two groups are engaged in cultural exchange, there are 16 permutations of acculturation strategies possible (e.g. an integrationist individual within an assimilationist host culture). According to the research, another critic of the fourfold of acculturation is that the people are less likely to cultivate a self-perception but either not assimilate other cultures or continuing the heritage cultures. The interactive acculturation model represents one proposed alternative to the typological approach by attempting to explain the acculturation process within a framework of state policies and the dynamic interplay of host community and immigrant acculturation orientations.

See also 

 Assimilation
 Naturalization
 Acclimatization
 Socialization
 Deculturalization
 Globalization
 Nationalization
 Acculturation gap
 Educational anthropology
 Enculturation
 Ethnocentrism
 Cultural relativism
 Cultural conflict
 Inculturation
 Cultural competence
 Language shift
 Westernization
 Cultural imperialism
 Linguistic imperialism
 Cultural assimilation
 Intercultural communication    
 Multiculturalism
 Fusion music
 Fusion cuisine

Notes

References

Ward, C. (2001). The A, B, Cs of acculturation. In D. Matsumoto (Ed.) "The handbook of culture and psychology" (pp. 411–445). Oxford, United Kingdom: Oxford University Press.

Cultural studies
Majority–minority relations
Immigration